Chardonnières is an arrondissement in the Sud department of Haiti.
As of 2015, the population was 78,410 inhabitants. Postal codes in the Chardonnières Arrondissement start with the number 85.

The arondissement consists of the following communes:
 Chardonnières
 Les Anglais
 Tiburon

References

Arrondissements of Haiti
Sud (department)